In fluid dynamics, Hicks equation or sometimes also referred as Bragg–Hawthorne equation or Squire–Long equation is a partial differential equation that describes the distribution of stream function for axisymmetric inviscid fluid, named after William Mitchinson Hicks, who derived it first in 1898. The equation was also re-derived by  Stephen Bragg and William Hawthorne in 1950 and by Robert R. Long in 1953 and by Herbert Squire in 1956. The Hicks equation without swirl was first introduced by George Gabriel Stokes in 1842. The Grad–Shafranov equation appearing in plasma physics also takes the same form as the Hicks equation.

that satisfies the continuity equation for axisymmetric flows automatically. The Hicks equation is then given by 

where

where  is the total head, c.f.

Derivation
Consider the axisymmetric flow in cylindrical coordinate system  with velocity components  and vorticity components . Since  in axisymmetric flows, the vorticity components are 

.

Continuity equation allows to define a stream function  such that

Therefore the azimuthal component of vorticity becomes

This implies that the circulation  round a material curve in the form of a circle centered on -axis is constant.

If the fluid motion is steady, the fluid particle moves along a streamline, in other words, it moves on the surface given by constant. Therefore the radial and the azimuthal component of vorticity are

.

For instance, substituting the above expression for  into the axial momentum equation leads to

This completes the required derivation.

Yih equation
For an incompressible flow , but with variable density, Chia-Shun Yih derived the necessary equation. The velocity field is first transformed using Yih transformation

where  is some reference density, with corresponding Stokes streamfunction  defined such that

Let us include the gravitational force acting in the negative  direction. The Yih equation is then given by

where

References

Fluid dynamics
Differential equations